Mumong is a residential suburb of Kuala Belait, the principal town of Belait District, Brunei. It comprises the original Mumong settlement, as well as the Mumong public housing estate of the Landless Indigenous Citizens' Housing Scheme. However, it officially consists of two village subdivisions, namely Mumong 'A' and Mumong 'B', which are under the mukim of Kuala Belait.

Name 

Geography
Mumong is located in the eastern part of Kuala Belait. It is surrounded by the suburb of Pandan to the north and north-west, the settlement of Panaga to east, and Belait River to the south. Mumong comprises the original Mumong village as well as Mumong Landless Indigenous Citizens' Housing Scheme; they make up the eastern and western parts of Mumong respectively.

History
Mumong was a small Malay village on the banks of the Belait River further upstream from Kuala Belait on the way to Kuala Balai.  The development of Kuala Belait at the turn of the century as the district capital and the construction of Jalan Singa Menteri and Jalan Tengah to like Kuala Belait to Seria saw the village grow south of Jalan Singa Menteri to become mainly a commuter community serving Kuala Belait and Seria towns.  The construction of the Seria Bypass in the 1980s further encouraged more settlement of the area as it provided a second link from the village to Kuala Belait and Seria.

The government of Brunei has also continued to improve the area with the construction of the Mumong Resettlement Area, a Landless Housing Scheme area located to the west of the kampong.  Other infrastructure constructed in the kampong includes the Mumong Youth Centre and Sports Complex in the 1990s which also serves the communities in the vicinity of Kuala Belait and Panaga, and the Kuala Belait Sewerage Treatment plant.

Mumong also lends its name to the Mumong Telephone exchange area, although the physical location of the exchange is in Kampong Pandan.

Administration 
The area of Mumong is officially administered as two villages, namely Mumong 'A' and Mumong 'B' (formerly known as Mumong Utara and Mumong Selatan respectively), which are the third- and lowest-level administrative divisions of Brunei. They are among the subdivisions within Kuala Belait, a mukim (subdistrict) in Belait District. Mumong 'A' comprises the Mumong public housing estate, as well as the nearby government residential area; Mumong 'B' makes up the Mumong village settlement. The two areas are also designated as postcode areas, thus having the postcodes KA1531 and KA1731 respectively.

The community of each village subdivision is headed by a village head. However, at present the village head position for Mumong 'B' is vacant, thus in the interim it is administered by the village head of Mumong 'A' and the position is currently held by Mohd Yusof bin Dulamin.

Mumong has also been incorporated into the municipality of Kuala Belait. It comprises the entire Mumong 'A' and parts of Mumong 'B'.

Infrastructure

Housing 

Transport
Most of the roads within the kampong is surfaced.  However, not all the roads are level to encourage effective drainage during a downpour.  The main road passing through the heart of the old village is Jalan Mumong, although this road has been bisected by into two by the Seria Bypass.

The Seria Bypass and Jalan Singa Menteri links Mumong west to Kuala Belait and from there to Miri in Malaysia, and east to Seria and from there to Tutong and Bandar Seri Begawan.

A road connects Mumong to Kuala Balai - this road bears the name of Jalan Mumong - Kuala Balai, and this is the only road linking Kuala Balai to the rest of the country.  This road was only surfaced in the 1990s, and has since seen a large number of industrial developments at the Mumong end.

There are no public buses serving the Mumong area.

There are no Ferry services, river services or port services in Mumong.  The nearest port is in neighbouring Kampong Sungai Duhon to the west along the Belait River, and the nearest deepwater port in Brunei is Muara Port.

There are no airports in Mumong.  Commercial travellers would have to travel to either Bandar Seri Begawan or Miri to catch a commercial flight.

Miscellaneous
Mumong Sports Complex serves as the main public venue for sports and recreational activities in Mumong and the area around the vicinity of Kuala Belait.  It contains a running track, a swimming pool, various sports courts and other facilities.

See also 
 Kampong Pandan, Brunei
 Kuala Belait

Notes

Populated places in Brunei

th:เซเรีย